Carlos Mateo Balmelli (born 9 January 1961 in Asunción) was a Paraguayan politician, who is the former President of the Senate of Paraguay. He belongs to the Authentic Radical Liberal Party.

References 

Presidents of the Senate of Paraguay
Paraguayan people of Italian descent
People from Asunción
1961 births
Living people
Authentic Radical Liberal Party politicians